Smoke tree, or Smoketree, may refer to:

 Smoke tree, the common name of several plants
 Smoke Tree Ranch, a resort in Palm Springs, California
 Smoke Tree Range, a 1937 American western film
 Smoketree Elementary School, in Lake Havasu City, Arizona
 Smoketree Ranch, a recording studio in Chatsworth, California

See also
Smokebush